White Oak is a city in Gregg County, Texas, United States. It was incorporated in 1960. The population was 6,225 as of 2020.

History
In the late 1800s White Oak was a small farming community with three sawmills located on thick forested land. By 1884, there were 15 families living in the area and either working at the large sawmills or farming the land. A small school was built near Hawkins Creek which doubled as a church. The school burned to the ground in 1885 due to suspected arson.

A new school was established in 1887. Local land owners, Andrew J. Tuttle and his father-in-law, John Bumpus, gathered a group of men in the area to erect a new school. Mr. Tuttle's uncle, Pleas Harris, and Kaleb Bumpus donated ground near a spring on which to build the new school. Local tales say Tuttle and Bumpus noticed the two White Oak trees on either side of the building after construction. It was then decided the community would be known as White Oak.

The community grew during the oil boom of the 1930s, and continued to increase after World War II. The City was incorporated in 1960.

Geography

White Oak is located at  (32.532349, –94.857638).

Demographics

As of the 2020 United States census, there were 6,225 people, 2,067 households, and 1,823 families residing in the city. The population density was 693.7 people per square mile (267.8/km). There were 2,182 housing units at an average density of 238.7 per square mile (92.2/km). There were 2,067 households, out of which 44.6% had children under the age of 18 living with them, 64.7% were married couples living together, 11.0% had a female householder with no husband present, and 20.4% were non-families. 17.5% of all households were made up of individuals, and 7.2% had someone living alone who was 65 years of age or older. The average household size was 2.81 and the average family size was 3.17.

In the city, the population was spread out, with 31.0% under the age of 18, 7.8% from 18 to 24, 30.1% from 25 to 44, 21.6% from 45 to 64, and 9.6% who were 65 years of age or older. The median age was 34 years. For every 100 females, there were 94.1 males. For every 100 females age 18 and over, there were 90.1 males.

The median income for a household in the city was $43,802, and the median income for a family was $50,781. Males had a median income of $44,063 versus $2,530 for females. The per capita income for the city was $17,486. About 9.9% of families and 11.4% of the population were below the poverty line, including 12.4% of those under age 18 and 14.0% of those age 65 or over.

Education
The vast majority of the City of White Oak is served by the White Oak Independent School District. A very small portion in the northwestern corner of White Oak is in the Gladewater Independent School District. A small section in the southeast corner of the town is in the Pine Tree Independent School District. 

The school system in the area was segregated until 1966, when Black children from nearby Shiloh were permitted to enroll in White Oak schools. The Shiloh School, which had been operating since shortly after the Civil War, closed its doors after desegregation.

Notable people

 Mike Barber, tight end for the Houston Oilers from 1976–1981, known for his scandal in the private high school coaching profession and his prison ministry
 Byron Hunt, played for the New York Giants in the early 1980s
 Sam Hunt, linebacker for the New England Patriots from 1974 to 1979
 Max McGee, wide-receiver at Tulane University during the 1950s, later for the Green Bay Packers; scored the first touchdown in Super Bowl I
 Kelcy Warren, billionaire chairman and CEO of Energy Transfer Partners, and co-founder of the record label Music Road Records. Donated millions to have the city of Dallas named a city park after his son Klyde Warren

References

External links
 City of White Oak, Texas
 Texas State Historical Association

Cities in Gregg County, Texas
Cities in Texas
Longview metropolitan area, Texas